Tajaé Lamar Sharpe (born December 23, 1994) is an American football wide receiver who is a free agent. He played college football at Massachusetts and was drafted in the fifth round of the 2016 NFL Draft by the Tennessee Titans.

Early years
Sharpe attended Piscataway Township High School in Piscataway, New Jersey and played football and basketball. He was a two-star recruit by Rivals.com and committed to the University of Massachusetts (UMass) to play college football.

College career
Sharpe played in 11 games and made eight starts as a freshman at UMass in 2012. He had 20 receptions for 206 yards. Sharpe led the team with 61 receptions for 680 yards and four touchdowns in 2013 and 85 receptions for 1,281 yards and seven touchdowns in 2014. As a senior in 2015, he broke UMass records for career receptions and receiving yards, finishing the season with 111 receptions for 1,319 yards and five touchdowns. Sharpe majored in communications.

College statistics

Professional career

Tennessee Titans
Sharpe was selected in the fifth round with the 140th overall pick by the Tennessee Titans in the 2016 NFL Draft.

2016 season

On May 9, 2016, the Titans signed Sharpe to a four-year, $2.61 million contract with a signing bonus of $274,884.

Throughout training camp, Sharpe competed with Andre Johnson, Dorial Green-Beckham, and Kendall Wright for a starting wide receiver position. He was named one of the starting wide receivers, opposite Rishard Matthews, going into the regular season.

Sharpe made his NFL debut and first NFL start in the season opener against the Minnesota Vikings. He finished the 16–25 loss with seven receptions for 76 yards. On November 13, 2016, he scored his first NFL touchdown on a 33-yard pass from Marcus Mariota in the third quarter as the Titans routed the Green Bay Packers by a score of 47–25. In the next game, he caught four passes for 68 receiving yards and a 34-yard touchdown pass as the Titans lost to the Indianapolis Colts on the road by a score of 24–17. The Titans tripled their win total from the previous year, finishing with a 9–7 record.

Sharpe finished his rookie season with 41 receptions for 522 yards and two touchdowns in 16 games and 10 starts.

2017 season

On September 2, 2017, Sharpe was placed on injured reserve with a foot injury, ending his season before it even started.

2018 season

Sharpe returned from his injury in time for the Titans' season opener against the Miami Dolphins. He recorded a 17-yard reception in the 27–20 road loss. Three weeks later against the Philadelphia Eagles, Sharpe scored his first touchdown of the season as the Titans won by a score of 26–23 in overtime. He finished the game with three receptions for 27 yards and a touchdown. During a narrow Week 7 20-19 loss to the Los Angeles Chargers in London, Sharpe matched his single-game career-high in receptions with seven and also gained a new career-high in receiving yards with 101. During a Week 11 38-10 road loss to the Indianapolis Colts, Sharpe caught five passes for 37 yards and a touchdown. The Titans finished with a third straight 9–7 season.

Sharpe finished the 2018 season with 26 receptions for 316 yards and two touchdowns in 16 games and 13 starts.

2019 season

During Week 7 against the Los Angeles Chargers, Sharpe caught his first touchdown of the season on a five-yard reception from Ryan Tannehill as the Titans won 23–20. In the next game against the Tampa Bay Buccaneers, he caught another touchdown as the Titans won 27–23. Sharpe did not play in Week 13 against the Indianapolis Colts due to a hamstring injury. During Week 16 against the New Orleans Saints, he caught five passes for 69 yards and two touchdowns in the 38–28 loss. Sharpe finished the regular season with 25 receptions for 329 yards and a career-high four touchdowns in 15 games and six starts.

The Titans finished with a fourth straight 9–7 season, qualifying for the playoffs and advancing to the AFC Championship where they lost to the eventual Super Bowl Champions, the Kansas City Chiefs. He played in all three of the Titans' playoff games, starting the Wild Card Round against the New England Patriots and recording a six-yard reception during the AFC Championship.

Minnesota Vikings
On March 25, 2020, Sharpe signed a one-year contract with the Minnesota Vikings. He was waived on December 14, 2020.

Kansas City Chiefs 
On December 22, 2020, the Kansas City Chiefs signed Sharpe to their practice squad. His practice squad contract with the team expired after the season on February 16, 2021. Sharpe re-signed with the Chiefs on April 9, 2021. He was waived on May 17, 2021.

Atlanta Falcons
On May 24, 2021, Sharpe signed with the Atlanta Falcons. He played in 15 games with seven starts, recording 25 receptions for 230 yards.

Chicago Bears
On May 12, 2022, Sharpe signed with the Chicago Bears. He was placed on injured reserve on August 31, 2022. He was released on September 9, 2022.

San Francisco 49ers
The San Francisco 49ers hosted Sharpe for a workout on October 31, 2022. He was signed to their practice squad on November 7, 2022. He was released on November 23, 2022.

NFL career statistics

Personal life
Sharpe's grandmother, Cozy Little, is a breast cancer survivor who was initially diagnosed in 2001.

Sharpe also has a rap career, under the name Show  As of June 6, 2021, Sharpe has released 4 full-length studio albums; First Quarter, released in 2019, Credentials and Delay of Game, both released in 2020, and Overtime, released in 2021.

Legal issues
On May 10, 2017, Sharpe and teammate Sebastian Tretola were named as defendants in a federal civil lawsuit that alleges the teammates were at a Nashville bar watching the 2017 NFL Draft. Dante R. Satterfield, the plaintiff in the lawsuit, claims he told Sharpe he'd probably lose playing time as a result of the Titans selecting wide receiver Corey Davis in the first round. The report alleges Sharpe responded by challenging him to a fight in a back alley and was accompanied by Tretola as a lookout. Satterfield claims he was knocked unconscious for 12 hours, suffered a concussion, and facial fractures from the incident and is suing for $500,000 in damages.

References

External links

UMass Minutemen bio

1994 births
Living people
People from Piscataway, New Jersey
Piscataway High School alumni
Sportspeople from Middlesex County, New Jersey
Players of American football from New Jersey
American football wide receivers
UMass Minutemen football players
Tennessee Titans players
Minnesota Vikings players
Kansas City Chiefs players
Atlanta Falcons players
Chicago Bears players
San Francisco 49ers players